Lauryn Eagle (born 11 December 1987) is an Australian professional boxer and water skiing champion. She was a contestant on the reality television show The Celebrity Apprentice Australia and is a former Miss Teen International 2004.

Water skiing
Coming from a water skiing family, Eagle's father Peter won the Australian title eleven times and sister Sarah placed second at the 2007 World Championships. She first learnt to ski at the age of four and started racing when she was nine years old. In 2003, she placed second in the Junior Division and at the next World Championships in 2005 she won the women's division title in the F2 class. In 2006, she won the Australian Speed Championships (U/19) and the Australian Marathon Championships (U/19). She then finished third at the 2007 World Championship in May in the Formula 1 Division. She retired shortly from racing after her father's death in 2008. In 2009 Lauryn returned to racing, placing third at the 2009 World Championships and, after suffering a big fall in the third race, seventh in the 2011 World Championships.

Professional boxing career
Eagle took up boxing and, upon turning professional in 2010, she went 2–0–1 with one knockout that year; in 2011 she suffered two split-decision losses.

On 13 July 2012, she defeated Kiangsak Sithsaithong (then 9–0–0 4KO) by a 5th-round TKO to win the World Boxing Foundation women's super featherweight title, improving her record to 3–2–1 2 knockouts.

The match was widely criticised within the boxing media. Commentators pointed out that Eagle had not fought more than six rounds in her career and had not won a fight since 2010. It was also noted that Sithsaithong's record was almost entirely against debut fighters in Thai villages.

In September 2012, Eagle participated in a promotional fight against Fox FM radio presenter Matt Tilley in a 'Champ vs Chump' promotion. Eagle won the three-round fight by a TKO in the third round. Two days later Eagle fought New Zealand's Nicki Bigwood as an undercard to former professional rugby league footballer Solomon Haumono's fight, winning in a unanimous decision in a six-round bout.

On January 30, 2013 she won the vacant Australia female lightweight title beating Nadine Brown on points at the Sydney Entertainment Centre.

Modeling and media
Eagle also has a keen interest in modelling. In 2005, she competed in Miss Teen Australia in Darwin and won the title along with Miss Congeniality. She then went to Costa Rica in Central America and competed in Miss Teen International and made a clean sweep, winning Miss Teen International, along with Most Photogenic, Miss Congeniality and Best Silhouette.

In 2006, she won the FHM Lara Croft Challenge, involving physical challenges of shooting, running, ropes, ladders, 4-wheel driving and swimming.

She starred in the second season of The Celebrity Apprentice Australia, in which she lasted until the final episode, where she finished fourth.

In the August edition of Maxim magazine, Eagle featured on the front cover and a photo shoot.

Personal life
In March 2008, Eagle's father Peter, a 10-time Australian water-skiing champion, died when his speedboat flipped and crashed.

On 19 May 2013, Eagle was arrested at a hotel in the Sydney suburb of Cronulla and charged with failing to leave premises when requested. She had recently split with her boyfriend, rugby league player Todd Carney.

On 9 January 2014, she was ordered by the courts to leave her mother alone after a dispute over a family dog.

On January 30, 2018 she was convicted of drug driving, fined $600 and banned from driving for six months. The magistrate rejected an application to record no conviction, noting her poor traffic record.

Professional boxing record

References

External links
Lauryn Eagle official webpage
Lauryn Eagle on Twitter
 

1987 births
Living people
Australian women boxers
Australian exercise instructors
Glamour models
Australian female models
Models from Sydney
Australian beauty pageant winners
Super-featherweight boxers
Australian water skiers
World super-featherweight boxing champions
Boxers from Sydney
The Apprentice Australia candidates
Lightweight boxers
Rugby league players wives and girlfriends